Mo Chhu is a major river in Bhutan. The word "Chhu" means "river" or "water" in Dzongkha, the official national language in Bhutan. The river rises in Gasa Dzongkhag (district) near the border between Bhutan and Tibet. From there, the Mo Chhu flows generally southward to Punakha in central Bhutan, where it joins the Pho Chhu from the northeast. The confluence of the two streams is immediately below the Punakha Dzong, which is the winter home of the Dratshang Lhentshog (Central Monk Body) and the Je Khenpo.
The combined streams are then joined by the Dang Chhu near the town of Wangdue Phodrang, and the name of the river becomes the Puna Tsang Chhu. The river then flows through Dagana and Tsirang Districts. After leaving Bhutan near the town of Lhamoidzingkha, formerly known as Kalikhola, the river enters Assam in India and is known as the Sankosh. The Sankosh ultimately empties into the Brahmaputra, flowing into the Bay of Bengal.

Bibliography

References

Rivers of Bhutan
International rivers of Asia